Reine Sosso  (born 19 March 1993) was a female Cameroonian football goalkeeper.

She was part of the Cameroon women's national football team at the 2012 Summer Olympics.  On club level she played for Franck Rollycek.

See also
 Cameroon at the 2012 Summer Olympics

References

External links
http://www.soccerpunter.com/players/253472-Reine-Sosso
https://www.nytimes.com/interactive/projects/london2012/soccer/womens/pool-e-2
https://www.nytimes.com/interactive/projects/london2012/soccer/womens/pool-e-4
http://womenssoccerafrica.blogspot.com/2012_07_01_archive.html

1993 births
Living people
Cameroonian women's footballers
Cameroon women's international footballers
Place of birth missing (living people)
Footballers at the 2012 Summer Olympics
Olympic footballers of Cameroon
Women's association football goalkeepers
21st-century Cameroonian women
20th-century Cameroonian women